Armeno (Piedmontese and Lombard: Armagn) is a comune (municipality) in the Province of Novara in the Italian region of Piedmont, located about  northeast of Turin and about  northwest of Novara.

Armeno borders the following municipalities: Ameno, Brovello-Carpugnino, Colazza, Gignese, Massino Visconti, Miasino, Nebbiuno, Omegna, Pettenasco and Pisano.

References

External links
Official website

Cities and towns in Piedmont
Articles which contain graphical timelines
Populated places on Lake Orta